Skauthøi is a mountain in Lom Municipality in Innlandet county, Norway. The mountain is surrounded by several other notable mountains including Glittertinden to the northeast; Steinbukampen to the east; Veopallan and Veotinden to the southeast; Spiterhøi, Leirhøi, and Veobreahesten to the south; and Galdhøpiggen to the west.

See also
List of mountains of Norway by height

References

Jotunheimen
Lom, Norway
Mountains of Innlandet